Greying is the fourth full-length album released by The Banner on Good Fight Music on December 9, 2014. The album was the band's first in six years and is distinct from their past releases for its use of post-punk and stronger influences of industrial metal and Gothic metal than what was found on their previous albums, with CVLT Nation describing Greying as a "spastic dance between the calculated and chaotic, branding it as The Banner’s most unique collection to date." The track "She Upon the Black Wolf" features guest vocals by Gallows vocalist Wade MacNeil.

Track listing 
The Dying of the Light - 6:01
Circle of Salt - 2:24
Crippling Despair - 2:32
Sunlight - 5:24
Unbaptized - 2:07
A Quiet Corner - 2:34
Send Me Down - 4:30
VII - 2:34
She Upon the Black Wolf - 2:52
Bones to Dust - 4:50
Sunset - 4:59

External links
The Banner page on Good Fight Music

2014 albums
The Banner (band) albums